The current flag of Weert was determined on 26 June 1980 as the municipal flag of the Limburgian municipality of Weert in the Netherlands. It replaced a previously determined flag from 1962. On 1 September 1980 the current flag was hoised for the first time during the official opening of the new municipal building at that time.

Flags

Current flag
The current flag consists of a yellow vertical strip on the left side where three red horns are depicted above each other. The rest of the flag consists of three horizontal strips of equal height in the colours white-blue-white. The colours and the horns are derived from the current coat of arms of the municipality.

First official municipal flag
On 7 February 1962 the first official municipal flag was determined. This consisted of two stripes of equal height in the colours white-blue, which was derived from the coat of arms at the time. This flag was identical to the flag of the municipality of Roermond (1957-2010).

Unofficial municipality flag
Before 1962 the municipality used an unofficial flag which consisted of two stripes of equal height in the colours blue-white.

Related images

References

 
 
 
 Translated from the Dutch version

Weert
Weert
Weert